Healing Through Fire is the sixth full-length album by British stoner metal band Orange Goblin, released in 2007. This is their first album released on Sanctuary Records, and their first not to be released by Rise Above Records. Ben Ward said of the album: "It's not a concept album at all, but we are using the theme of the Great Plague of London and the Great Fire that followed for a lot of lyrical and musical influence. It's definitely the strongest material we have written".

A limited number of copies came with a bonus DVD. The DVD features a live set recorded at The Mean Fiddler in London on 16 December 2006 and also includes some interviews and studio footage.

Track listing 
All songs written and arranged by Orange Goblin (Ben Ward, Joe Hoare, Martyn Millard, Chris Turner).
 "The Ballad of Solomon Eagle" – 5:18
 "Vagrant Stomp" – 4:10
 "The Ale House Braves" – 3:50
 "Cities of Frost" 5:35
 "Hot Knives and Open Sores" – 4:22
 "Hounds Ditch" – 5:30
 "Mortlake (Dead Water)" 2:11
 "They Come Back (Harvest of Skulls)" – 4:44
 "Beginners Guide to Suicide" – 8:06

Live DVD 
 "Some You Win, Some You Lose"
 "Quincy the Pig Boy"
 "Getting High on the Bad Times"
 "The Ballad of Solomon Eagle"
 "Hot Magic Red Planet"
 "Round Up the Horses"
 "They Come Back"
 "Your World Will Hate This"
 "Blue Snow"
 "Scorpionica"

Personnel

Orange Goblin 
Ben Ward: vocals
Joe Hoare: guitars
Martyn Millard: bass
Chris Turner: drums

Additional personnel
Jason Graham: keyboards

Production
Produced, engineered and mixed by Mark Daghorn
Mastered by Andy Pearce

Trivia 
The art for the audio disc incorporated the Latin phrase "Nam ut quisque est vir optimus, ita difficillime esse alios improbos suspicatur", written on the outer edge. This phrase is from the writings of Cicero, a Roman orator, and can be translated as "The more virtuous any man is, the less easily does he suspect others to be vicious."

References 

2007 albums
Orange Goblin albums
Sanctuary Records albums